Carol Milne (born 1 January 1962) is an internationally recognized Canadian American sculptor living in Seattle, Washington. She is best known for her Knitted Glass work, winning the Silver Award, in the International Exhibition of Glass Kanazawa Japan 2010.

Education 
Milne's education included:
 Hot cast and Kiln-cast glass, Pratt Fine Arts Center, Seattle, Washington 2000 – 2002
 Graduate studies in sculpture, University of Iowa, Iowa City, Iowa 1988 – 1989
 Bachelor of Landscape Architecture, University of Guelph, Guelph, Ontario, Canada 1985
 French Language Studies, Université de Strasbourg, Strasbourg, France 1980

Collections 
Amazon Headquarters, Seattle, WA

Asheville Art Museum, Asheville, NC

Fuller Craft Museum, Brockton, MA

Glasmuseum Lette,  Coesfeld, Germany
The Glass Furnace, Istanbul, Turkey

Gustav Selter GmbH & Co KG, Germany

The Kamm Teapot Foundation, Sparta, NC

MusVerre Nord, Sars Poteries, France

Notojima Glass Art Museum, Ishikawa, Japan

UVU Woodbury Art Museum, Orem, UT  all above

Articles and Interviews 
Woven Glass: Artist Carol Milne knits delicate sculptures

Artbeat NW 10-08-19 Glass Artist Carol Milne  Artbeat Northwest Arts and Culture Podcast

Seattle Magazine Arts and Culture.  Amazon Studios: Inside the Tech Giant's Employee Art Programs

Career
Milne graduated in 1985 from the University of Guelph, Ontario, majoring in Landscape Architecture.

After working for a short while at a landscape architect's office, Milne worked at a pre-press graphics shop managing a small group of digital typesetters. In 1988–89 she was a graduate student in the University of Iowa's MFA program in sculpture.

Licton Springs Park

From 1993 to 1996, Milne re-designed the Licton Springs, Seattle Playground in Seattle, Washington.
Working with ceramicist Lisa Halverson, and community volunteers, they worked with local  school children to make urban wildlife tiles that were incorporated into the park design.

Since 2000, Milne has worked primarily in glass, although knitting also plays a major part in her non-glass sculptures. See, for example, "Grow Lights".

Knitted Glass

In 2006, Milne created "Knitted Glass", incorporating the techniques of knitting, lost-wax casting, mold-making, and kiln-casting. As Milne describes in, "Knitting wasn't yet cool...": The process involves (A) knitting the original art piece using wax strands, (B) surrounding the wax with a heat-tolerant refractory material,  (C ) then removing the wax by melting it out, thus creating a mold; (D) the mold is placed in a kiln where lead crystal "frit" heated to 1,530 Fahrenheit melts into the mold; (E) after the mold has cooled, the mold material is removed to reveal the finished piece within.

Books 
E-BOOK - In the Name of Love

E-BOOK - Knitted Glass: kiln cast lead crystal bowls by Carol Milne

E-BOOK - Glass Slippers by Carol Milne

E-BOOK Carol Milne Knitted Glass by Steve Isaacson

Carol Milne Knitted Glass: How Does She Do That? Paperback

Recognition
Amazon Artist in Residence, Amazon Headquarters, Seattle, WA, 2019
Juror's award, “All Things Considered 9: Basketry in the 21st Century”, NBO; 2017
1 Special Citation & 1 Honorable Mention,  9th Cheongju International Craft Juried Competition, Cheongju, Republic of Korea, 2015
Joan Eliot Sappington Award, “On the Fringe: Today’s Twist on Fiber Art”, Lake Oswego Fest.of the Arts, 2015
2 Honorable Mentions, Cheongju International Craft Juried Competition, Cheongju, Republic of Korea, 2011 
Honorable Mention purchase award, Art of Our Century, UVU Woodbury Art Museum, Orem, UT
Silver Prize, International Exhibition of Glass Kanazawa, Japan, 2010
Grants for Artist Projects (GAP) Award, Artist's Trust, Seattle, WA, 2007
Ripley's Believe It or Not! - Glass Knitting, 2015

Notable Exhibitions
2019

 Carol Milne: Knit Wit, Bainbridge Island Museum of Art 

2017

 Vogue Knitting LIVE! Seattle, Meydenbauer Center, Bellevue, WA
 Carol Milne: Knitting Glass, Schiepers Gallery, Hasselt, Belgium

2015

 Vogue Knitting LIVE! New York City Marriott Marquis, NY, NY

2012

10 x 10 x 10 Tieton, Tieton, WA
Bellwether 2012: Artwalk Bellevue, Bellevue, WA
Teapots! 6, Morgan Contemporary Glass Gallery, Pittsburgh, PA
Hot Tea! 13th Biennial Teapot Exhibition, Craft Alliance, St. Louis, MO
International Artist Exhibition (online), The Contemporary Glass Society,

2011
7th Cheongju International Craft Juried Competition, Cheongju, Republic of Korea
Art of Our Century, UVU Woodbury Art Museum, Orem, UT

2010
Standing Tall: Towers in Glass, Gallery IMA, Seattle, WA (solo show)
The International Exhibition of Glass Kanazawa 2010, Design Center Ishikawa, Kanazawa, Japan and Notojima Glass Art Museum, Ishikawa, Japan
Bellwether 2010: Artwalk Bellevue, Bellevue, WA
Contain: Vessels and the Art of Containment, Luke & Eloy Gallery, Pittsburgh, PA
31st Annual Mesa Contemporary Crafts, Mesa Arts Center, Mesa, AZ

2009
Facing the Future, Gallery IMA, Seattle, WA (solo show)
The Perfect Fit – Shoes Tell Stories, The Fuller Craft Museum, Brockton, MA:  traveled to The Nicolaysen Art Museum, Casper, WY;  Albany Institute of History & Art, Albany, New York;  Kimball Art Center, Park City, UT;  Boise Art Museum, Boise, ID
Fibers Expanded, Luke and Eloy Gallery, Pittsburgh, PA
Basket show, Museo Gallery, Langley, WA

2008
Pilchuck on Display: An Exhibition of International Glass Art, The Westin Hotel, Seattle, WA
Glass Slippers, Gallery IMA, Seattle, WA
High Tech/Low Tech, Oregon College of Arts & Crafts, Portland, OR
In the Name of Love, installation of 38 glass sculptures, Gallery IMA, Seattle, WA

2007
Pilchuck on Display: An Exhibition of International Glass Art, The Westin Hotel, Seattle, WA
Animalia, Allied Arts, Richland, WA
Craft Biennial: A Review of Northwest Art & Craft, OCAC, Portland, OR
Lucent: A Survey of Contemporary Canadian Glass, Illingworth Kerr Gallery, Calgary, Alberta

2006
To Hold Within: Redefining the Container, Part I Waterworks Gallery, Friday Harbor, WA
Pilchuck on Display: An Exhibition of International Glass Art, The Westin Hotel, Seattle, WA
Pilchuck 20, 2nd Annual Exhibition Stewart Gallery, Boise Idaho
Good Things/Small Packages: An Intimate Look at Small Glass, Public Glass, San Francisco
North American Glass 2006, Guilford Art Center, Guilford, CT, Juried by James Mongrain
Crafts National, Lancaster Museum of Art, Lancaster, Pennsylvania

2005
Pilchuck on Display: An Exhibition of International Glass Art, The Westin Hotel, Seattle, WA
New Hope 3rd Annual Indoor Sculpture Exhibit, New Hope, Pennsylvania
2004
Pilchuck on Display: An Exhibition of International Glass Art, The Westin Hotel, Seattle, WA
Pilchuck Glass School Instructor's Show, Pilchuck Glass School, Stanwood, WA
Northwest Biennial: Building Wise, Tacoma Art Museum, Tacoma, WA

2003
Pratt Glass Art Instructor's Exhibit, Pratt Fine Arts Center, Seattle, WA

2002
Pilchuck on Display: An Exhibition of International Glass Art, The Westin Hotel, Seattle, WA

References

External links

 
 Pre-2016 carolmilne.com 
 Shoreline News - Glass artist Carol Milne sculpts with light for SummerSet Arts Festival
 Humor in Craft by Brigitte Martin
 Honorable mention awards were given to Nathan Barnes, Larry Goodin, Carol Milne, and Elizabeth Morisette.

Canadian women artists
Canadian sculptors
Canadian glass artists
Women glass artists
1962 births
Living people
Pacific Northwest artists
Artists from Seattle
University of Iowa alumni
American glass artists